The 2013–14 Elite Ice Hockey League season was the 11th season of the Elite Ice Hockey League. The regular season (the primary competition in UK ice hockey) was won by the Belfast Giants, claiming their third Elite League championship. The regular season began on September 7, 2013, and ended on March 22, 2014.

Teams

Elite League Table

GP=Games Played
W=Win,
L=Lose,
OTL=Over Time Loses,
SOL=Shoot Out Loses,
Pts=Points,

Elite League Playoffs

Quarterfinals

|}

Semifinals

3rd place game

Final

Challenge Cup

 NOTE: Some Cup games double up as League games due to scheduling constraints.

Top 4 in each group qualify for Quarter-Finals

(Q) denotes teams who qualified from the quarter-finals into the semi-finals.

Group A

Group B

Challenge Cup Knockout Stages

 The Knockout Stages were two-legged affairs, home and away. Aggregate figures shown in bold.

References

External links
Official Site

Elite Ice Hockey League seasons
1
United